Fayetteville station is an Amtrak train station in Fayetteville, North Carolina, United States. It is located in the Fayetteville Downtown Historic District, next to the Airborne & Special Operations Museum.

History
The station was originally built in 1911 by the Atlantic Coast Line Railroad, designed by architect Joseph F. Leitner, and was the third station to be located at the corner of Hay and Hillsborough Streets. 

In addition to serving the north-south ACL main line, into the late 1930s, the station afforded connection with a line to Mt. Airy via Sanford and Greensboro to the northwest, and another train to Wilmington to the southeast.

The station has been listed on the National Register of Historic Places since July 7, 1982. Between 2005 and 2006, the station was restored in an effort to bring it up to compliance with the Americans with Disabilities Act of 1990.

Services
(The Auto Train passes through nightly but does not make a stop.) The facility is open daily at 10:00am-5:45pm and 10:00pm-5:45am, which includes the ticket office, passenger assistance, baggage service and the waiting area. A Subway restaurant is also located in the facility.

Because of construction of a new baseball stadium, hotel and parking deck, parking for the station is temporarily located behind the Airborne & Special Operations Museum. When construction is completed, pay parking will only be available via the parking deck.

Located one block south, along Winslow Street, is the FAST Center, providing local and intercity bus services.

References

External links 

Fayetteville Station – NC By Train
Fayetteville Amtrak Station (USA Rail Guide -- Train Web)

Railway stations on the National Register of Historic Places in North Carolina
Amtrak stations in North Carolina
F
Transportation in Fayetteville, North Carolina
Buildings and structures in Fayetteville, North Carolina
Railway stations in the United States opened in 1911
National Register of Historic Places in Cumberland County, North Carolina